Chemalsky District (Chemal'skiy rayon; , Çamal aymak) is an administrative and municipal district (raion), one of the ten in the Altai Republic, Russia. It is located in the northwest of the republic. Its administrative center is the rural locality (a selo) of Chemal. As of the 2010 Census, the total population of the district was 9,441, with the population of Chemal accounting for 38.2% of that number.

History
The district was established on August 26, 1992, when it was split from Shebalinsky District.

Administrative and municipal status
Within the framework of administrative divisions, Chemalsky District is one of the ten in the Altai Republic. As a municipal division, the district is incorporated as Chemalsky Municipal District. Both administrative and municipal districts are divided into the same seven rural settlements, comprising nineteen rural localities. The selo of Chemal serves as the administrative center of both the administrative and municipal district.

References

Notes

Sources

Districts of the Altai Republic
States and territories established in 1992